Mir Zia Mahmood (born 7 January 1946) is a Pakistani-American professional bridge player. He is a World Bridge Federation and American Contract Bridge League Grand Life Master. As of April 2011 he was the 10th-ranked World Grand Master.

Biography
Zia was born in Karachi, British India, now Pakistan. Zia was educated in England from the age of six to twenty-one. He qualified as a Chartered Accountant of the Institute of England and Wales and spent three years running a family business in Pakistan. He also spent eighteen months in Abu Dhabi developing business interests.

Mahmood is married to Lady Emma, his wife since February 2001. She is the daughter of Neil Primrose, 7th Earl of Rosebery. They have two sons: Zain and Rafi.

Bridge
Mahmood achieved international bridge fame, almost overnight, during one fortnight in 1981 when he led Pakistan to a second-place finish in the Bermuda Bowl tournament. The Bermuda Bowl is the most important open world championship, and that was the first participation by anyone from the World Bridge Federation geographic zone "Asia and the Middle East". It also tied Taiwan for the best finish by anyone from outside Europe and the United States. It is now the second best finish from outside Europe and the United States, after Brazil won the tournament in 1989.

Five years later, Zia led a short-handed team from Pakistan to second place in the 1986 Rosenblum Cup tournament, which is the open world championship in even-number non-Olympic years. That remains tied for best finish by anyone from outside Europe and the United States. The event is transnational, but none of the nine winning teams has included a single player from outside Europe and the United States.

Zia Mahmood is the author of Bridge My Way, an autobiography, and has hosted many TV shows. For many years his regular partner was Masood Salim (deceased), followed by Michael Rosenberg, and now Bob Hamman—as members of Nick Nickell's professional team through spring 2012.

Beginning 2012/2013, Nickell has replaced Hamman and Zia with Bobby Levin–Steve Weinstein.

Zia has represented the United States in world competition, and thus he won his first major world championship, the 2009 Bermuda Bowl. Although he won the quadrennial Mixed Teams in 2004 with Sabine Auken and a French pair. He still considers himself Pakistani, however: "I am proud and happy to be representing America, but my Pakistani identity is in no way submerged. I feel like a Pakistani who is living in America and playing for America." To prove his point, Zia and his American teammates once played their opening match in Pakistani dress.

Mahmood spends much of his time in Great Britain and the United States and is very much part of the London bridge scene. He wrote a weekly column for The Guardian newspaper until January 2012, when the paper stopped covering bridge.

The ACBL Hall of Fame inducted Zia in 2007. According to the citation sometime that year, he was a London resident.

Zia won the ACBL's 3-day Life Master Pairs championship in 2000, 2004, and 2007 with three different partners. After placing second in the 85th rendition, July 2014, he is a 3-time winner and 5-time runner-up with seven different partners.

Mariusz Puczyński is a Polish bridge player whose greatest achievement has been to win the Bronze Medal in the 2004 European Bridge Championship. His teammates on that occasion included Cezary Balicki and Adam Żmudziński, for many years known as Poland's strongest pair and as one of the strongest pairs in the world. During the 2015 bridge cheating scandals, Puczyński satisfied himself that his former teammates had not been playing honestly, and returned his medal to the European Bridge League because he no longer wanted it. In early 2019, Puczyński had by chance the opportunity to partner Zia in a tournament in Poland. Someone told Zia about Puczyński's gesture, and he warmly complimented him for it. On 15 May 2019, Puczyński received a package through the post as a present. It contained the Gold Medal which Zia had won at the 2009 Bermuda Bowl.

Honors
 ACBL Hall of Fame, 2007
 ACBL Honorary Member of the Year 2006

Awards
 ACBL Player of the Year 1991, 1996, 2000, 2005, 2012
 Mott-Smith Trophy 1991, 1996
 Herman Trophy 2005, 2012
 IBPA Award (Personality of the Year) 2007
 Le Bridgeur Award (Best Played Hand of the Year) 1984
 Romex Award (Best Bid Hand of the Year) 1983, 1987
 Precision Award (Best Defended Hand of the Year) 1995

Wins 
 Bermuda Bowl (1) 2009
 World Transnational Mixed Teams (1) 2004
 Gold Cup (1) 2010 
 North American Bridge Championships (26)
 von Zedtwitz Life Master Pairs (3) 2000, 2004, 2007
 Blue Ribbon Pairs (1) 1998
 Nail Life Master Open Pairs (5) 1990, 1991, 2005, 2007, 2012
 Jacoby Open Swiss Teams (1) 2009
 Vanderbilt (4) 1994, 1996, 2015, 2023
 Mitchell Board-a-Match Teams (4) 1991, 1996, 2006, 2008
 Chicago Mixed Board-a-Match (1) 1999
 Reisinger (5) 1987, 1989, 1996, 2008, 2009
 Spingold (2) 1991, 2003
 United States Bridge Championships (3)
  Open Team Trials (3) 1997, 1999, 2006
 Asia & the Middle East Championships (5)
 Open Teams (5) 1981, 1983, 1985, 1987, 1991
 Other notable wins:
 Buffett Cup (1) 2006
 Richard Lederer Memorial Trophy (7) 1978, 1990, 1998, 1999, 2000, 2002, 2006
 Cavendish Invitational Teams (1) 1986
 Staten Bank World Top Invitational Pairs (1) 1988
 Cap Gemini Pandata World Top Invitational Pairs (1) 1992
 Cap Volmac World Top Invitational Pairs (1) 1995
 Cap Gemini World Top Invitational Pairs (2) 1998, 2000
 Cap Gemini Ernst & Young World Top Invitational Pairs (1) 2001
 Politiken World Pairs (1) 1995
 Omar Sharif Individual (1) 1990
 Portland Club Individual (1) 1990

Runners-up
 Bermuda Bowl (2) 1981, 2007 
 Rosenblum Cup (2) 1986, 2010 
 World Open Pairs Championship (1) 2002
 Buffett Cup (1) 2008
 Cavendish Invitational Pairs (1) 1998
 Gold Cup (1) 1982 
 North American Bridge Championships (27)
 Jacoby Open Swiss Teams (3) 1992, 2010, 2014 
 Mitchell Board-a-Match Teams (1) 2004 
 Nail Life Master Open Pairs (2) 2000, 2001 
 Reisinger (3) 2002, 2003, 2005 
 Roth Open Swiss Teams (1) 2013 
 Silodor Open Pairs (4) 1991, 1994, 2006, 2007 
 Spingold (3) 1993, 1995, 2011 
 Vanderbilt (4) 1988, 1990, 1991, 2000 
 Wernher Open Pairs (1) 1987 
 von Zedtwitz Life Master Pairs (5) 1992, 2005, 2011, 2012, 2014
 United States Bridge Championships (5)
 Open Team Trials (5) 1996, 2000, 2002, 2004, 2005
 Other notable 2nd places:
 Forbo-Krommenie International Teams (1) 1997
 Cavendish Invitational Teams (2) 1995, 2006

See also
 "Your Deal, Mr. Bond", a published James Bond short story in which the secret agent impersonates Mahmood

Notes

References

External links
  – with video interviews
 
 
 Nickell Team at the United States Bridge Federation (2009?) – with player profiles
 Zia Mahmood at Bridge Winners 
  

1946 births
Pakistani contract bridge players
American contract bridge players
Bermuda Bowl players
Pakistani emigrants to the United States
Pakistani expatriates in the United Kingdom
Contract bridge writers
Living people
Recipients of the Pride of Performance
Game players from Karachi